Tim Hartley (born 2 January 1986), also known by the nickname of "Trev", is an English former professional rugby league footballer who played in the 2000s and 2010s.

Background
Hartley was born in Warrington, Cheshire, England, he was a pupil at Bedford High School, Leigh, after retiring at 24 has since been a P.E. Teacher and as of now 2020 works in Turnkey construction in hospitals.

Club career
Hartley made his début for Salford City Reds aged 18 against the Leeds Rhinos. After 2 Seasons was part of a Transfer fee to Harlequins Rl under Tony Rea. Then played for Halifax, Widnes and Leigh in the championship winning the Northern Rail cup in 2009.

References

External links
 (archived by web.archive.org) Statistics at slstats.org
Hartley secures move to Halifax

1986 births
Living people
English rugby league players
Halifax R.L.F.C. players
Leigh Leopards players
Leigh Miners Rangers players
London Broncos players
Rugby league centres
Rugby league five-eighths
Rugby league players from Warrington
Rugby league wingers
Salford Red Devils players
Widnes Vikings players